Steven J. Rosen, also known as Satyaraja Das (born 1955), is an American author. He is the founding editor of The Journal of Vaishnava Studies and an associate editor of Back to Godhead, the magazine of the Hare Krishna movement. He has authored more than 30 books on Vaishnavism and related subjects, including Black Lotus: The Spiritual Journey of an Urban Mystic (2007), which is the life story of Bhakti Tirtha Swami.

Works

References

External links

Official website

Living people
1955 births
20th-century Hindu philosophers and theologians
21st-century Hindu philosophers and theologians
Academic journal editors
American Hare Krishnas
American Indologists
American magazine editors
American male writers
American non-fiction writers
American theologians
Converts to Hinduism
International Society for Krishna Consciousness religious figures
Vegetarianism activists